Edouard Bertholet (1883–1965), known as Sar Alkmaion, was the Grand Master of the Ordre Martiniste et Synarchique (OM&S) from 1953 to 1965. He was preceded by Victor Blanchard, founder of the Order, who was the Grand Master from 1921 till his death in 1953.

A Swiss doctor and a great scholar of Tradition, Bertholet was able to harmonise scientific research with his spiritual interests throughout his life.

Biography 
Born in Switzerland at Rougemont, in the district of Vaud on June 8, 1883, under the double sign of Gemini, Edouard never ceased duplicating, indeed multiplying his life and talents: medical doctor, writer, musician, esotericist. A universal man like those conceived by the Renaissance, and whose quiet generosity and radiant goodness could not be hidden by his sparkling spirit.

When he left the University of Lausanne, holding his medical titles, he seemed to be the son of an era that Tame and Renan oriented towards: a skeptical positiveness, and he saw the sciences as the only concrete answer to human problems. This view was quickly confirmed by the problems around him. Confronted with the drama of alcoholism, he started an anti-alcoholic campaign that he pursued to the end of his life. He promised never again to taste the good wine and he rigorously kept his word, which tells us about the man: capable of paying with his self and of completely engaging himself within his research.

A few years later, Auguste Forel, doctor and world renowned naturalist revealed the keys of hypnotism to him. He soon substituted it with magnetism, a softer technique, better tolerated by the sick.

The method was not original. A century earlier, Mesmer tried to codify a medical magnetism which started a school, and, a convention on magnetism was held in Paris in 1889, four years before Hector Durville formed his school of magnetism. But it still had to be officialised and regulated and that is to what Edouard Bertholet dedicated himself.

Using photographic plates, he engaged first in the detection of the luminescent rays emitted by one’s hands. This way he proved the existence of the fluid defined by the Sages and ancient Alchemists as a quintessence of human energies. He then experimented with its effects on plants, seeds of nuts, watercress and especially marrow (squash), two pots of which he isolated and watered in the same manner.

Every day, morning and evening, he magnetised one of these “guinea pigs”, always the same one. At the end of two months, this one was taller, thicker and more vital than its counterpart. The doctor then reversed the magnetism. Leaving the treated plant, he started control on the other pot, which, two weeks later had already surpassed the first one, and which, having finished flowering at the end of a month, saw its flowers surpass its competitor’s by 6 centimetres.

Since this was so, why not use the vitalising fluid in medicine? And so Bertholet became the pioneer of an extraordinary therapy which combines magnetism with fasting, the benefits of which he had long been advocating: “Disease is the consequence of a series of mistakes made against morality and hygiene and especially food hygiene”, he explained. “It constitutes a natural effort of the organism to get rid, by successive cleansing crises, the toxins and cellular poisons”. Only one action, only one “operation without a knife” — the fast — which enables one to re-establish the disturbed equilibrium! He himself experimented with it many times and he knew its benefits and its risks. He knew that some temperaments cannot stand such a treatment but the revitalising magnetism would be the palliative preventing the headaches and the nauseous state, which sometimes accompanies fasting.

Bertholet practiced sensible medicine at home in his big house “Violettes” located near the lake, facing the mountains and rising above Lake Geneva. Every morning it was he himself who brought the special purges to his patients. He himself weighed them and prepared their potions. They then met in the garden where they played bowls and talked before going to the nearby beach. They often watched the doctor eating with his family, but, strangely enough, none of them were hungry; within a few weeks they saw their general malaise, heart failure, nephritis and tuberculosis adenitis disappear. “Those who came to the Violettes on a stretcher” as Pierre-Genillard, the doctor’s nephew, remembers, “left on their feet”. They were immediately replaced by new ones coming from all over the world, attracted not only by the ‘miraculous cures’ but also by the radiance emanating from him. Smiling and serious, the forehead high, the beard white towards the end of his life, attentive to human suffering, he personified the authentic therapist, the authority who pain does not resist.

He was nevertheless not content with treating and healing. A talented musician, his patients sometimes perceived late at night the echo of his violoncello carried by the myths of Tristan or Parsifal. He also wrote “Les Guerisons Mystiques et le Magnetisme” (The Mystic Healings and Magnetism), “Le Retour a la Sante par le jeune” (The Return to Health by Fasting), almost 25 titles he wrote based on medicine or the great ideas of esotericism.

With a mind open to all kinds of thoughts, he became enthusiastic about oriental philosophy.

He invited the swamis Jathsvarananda and Sidheswaranda to the “Société Vaudoise d’Etudes Psychiques” which he founded in 1927. The members flocked, fascinated by the stature, the universal culture of Dr Bertholet, and by the lecturers he invited, all bearers of unusual knowledge. Among them: Alexandra David-Neel, who, back from Tibet, had her rheumatism treated at the “Violettes”.
Subtle specialist of Hinduism, Vedantism, Taoism, — dazzling his audiences by magistral  conferences on Ramakrishna, Randa and Paramananda, the doctor remained nevertheless an occidental impregnated by the “Christic” message and the tradition transmitted by such elites as Albert La Grand, Paracelse, Louis-Claude de Saint-Martin, Stanislas de Guaita, Péladan and Master Philippe de Lyon.

Dr Bertholet never met the latter though, unless on those invisible roads where the authentic exchanges take place. But he wrote a “Reincarnation d’aprés le Maitre Phillipe de Lyon”. And judging the Sar Péladan, intellectual pole of the Master of Arbresle, to have been misunderstood during his time, he mentioned this enigmatic figure in “La pensée et les secrets du Sar Joséphin Péladan” — four volumes which confer a new scope to the Rosicrucian ideas which impregnated the thought of the Sar. The doctor shared them so well that he revived in 1933 the “Ordre Ancien et Mystique de la Rose+Croix”, (the Ancient and Mystic Order of the Rose+Cross) — an extension of the psychic society which is a group of awareness and not of Initiation.

It was in the quietness of the “Violettes” that he himself continued his own quest that he installed in his own house a small chapel where the Christ and the Virgin are next to the Buddha. The writer Jean Palaiseul says he saw him there “aureoled by his white beard of a prophet and by his ascetic life, standing in front of a big crucifix and wooden polychrome statues depicting the verses of the Koran, arranged around a candelabra with seven branches”.

An ecumenical mind before its time, he knew that the energy, which animates all things, resides neither in ‘labels’ nor in narrow sectarianism. And that wisdom is one, above human divergences.

It was towards this unity, within which all contradictions are solved, that he tended more and more. Retired at Vevey during his last years, sick but serene, he composed his last work “Mystere et Ministere des Anges” getting closer and closer to this love he knew to be, more than all science, the only key to life.

It was from Bertholet (Sar Alkmaion), that Louis Bentin (Sar Gulion) received his authority as Sovereign Delegate General and Grand Master of Great Britain and the Commonwealth. Sar Gulion was succeeded by Sar Patientous; which later gave birth to the Hermetic Order of Martinists (H.O.M.). 

Edouard Bertholet died on March 13, 1965, at nine o’clock in the morning, a few days before spring.

References 

1883 births

1965 deaths